Daewoo is the Korean word for "Great Universe" and may refer to:

 Daewoo, a former South Korean conglomerate (chaebol) containing the following divisions:
 Daewoo Motors
 Daewoo Automotive Components Co. Ltd.
 Daewoo Bus Co., Ltd.
 Daewoo Commercial Vehicle Co. Ltd.
 Tata Daewoo Commercial Vehicle
 Daewoo Motor Sales
 GM Daewoo
 Architectural Iaan Div.
 SAA-Seoul Auto Auction
 Daewoo Electronics
 Daewoo Electronic Components Co. Ltd.
 Daewoo Electric Motor Industries Ltd.
 Orion Electric Co. Ltd.
 Daewoo Precision Industries
 S&T Daewoo Co. Ltd.
 Daewoo Textile Co. Ltd.
 Daewoo Heavy Industries (DHI)
 Daewoo Shipbuilding & Marine Engineering (DSME)
 Daewoo Securities
 Daewoo Telecom Ltd.
 Daewoo Information Systems Co. Ltd.
 Daewoo Corporation
 Daewoo Construction
 Keangnam Enterprises
 Daewoo International
 Daewoo Development Co. Ltd.
 Daewoo Hotels
 Institute for Advanced Engineering

 Automobile Craiova, also known as Daewoo Automobile Romania
 UzDaewooAvto, also known as Daewoo Automobile in Uzbekistan
 Daewoo Express or Sammi Daewoo Express is an inter-city common carrier of passengers by bus serving over 30 destinations in Pakistan.